Santokh Singh Matharu (10 March 1942 – 21 July 2011) was a Kenyan field hockey player. He competed at the 1964 Summer Olympics and the 1968 Summer Olympics.

References

External links
 

1942 births
2011 deaths
Kenyan male field hockey players
Olympic field hockey players of Kenya
Field hockey players at the 1964 Summer Olympics
Field hockey players at the 1968 Summer Olympics
Field hockey players from Punjab, India
Indian emigrants to Kenya
Sportspeople from Nairobi
Kenyan people of Indian descent
Kenyan people of Punjabi descent